The Government House Leader for the Province of New Brunswick, Canada is the provincial cabinet minister responsible for planning and managing the government's legislative program in the Legislative Assembly of New Brunswick. The position is not legally entitled to cabinet standing on its own, so all Government House Leaders must simultaneously hold another portfolio (or be specifically designated as a Minister without Portfolio).

The current Government House Leader in New Brunswick is [Rick Doucet (New Brunswick politician)].

List of recent government house leaders
 Mike Murphy 2007–present
 Stuart Jamieson 2006–2007
 Bev Harrison 2006
 Brad Green 1999–2006
 Greg Byrne 1998–1999
 Doug Tyler 1997–1998
 Ray Frenette 1987–1997
 Malcolm MacLeod ?–1987

See also
Government House Leader for the equivalent position in the federal House of Commons
House Leader

References
 Government of New Brunswick, list of Department Ministers 1944-2006 (PDF file)

Government House Leader